{{DISPLAYTITLE:C16H19N3O3}}
The molecular formula C16H19N3O3 (molar mass: 301.34 g/mol, exact mass: 301.1426 u) may refer to:

 Febrifugine
 HIOC
 Prazitone (AGN-511)

Molecular formulas